Eastern Howard School Corporation is located in Greentown, Indiana.  Eastern Schools is a public school district which serves Greentown, Indiana and eastern Howard County, Indiana.

History
Public schooling in the area began in 1850. The merged school district dates back to 1950. Listed in the US News, Best High Schools in Indiana.
 In 2017 the school was ranked in the 2017 Best School Districts in Indiana.

Mascot 
The school mascot is the Comet, as seen in the school logo.

Administration 
Dr. Tracy Caddell, Superintendent (1893-2017)
Dr. Keith Richie (2018–Present)

Building directory 
Eastern Elementary School
Eastern Jr./Sr. High School

References

External links 
 

School districts in Indiana
Education in Howard County, Indiana
School districts established in 1950
1950 establishments in Indiana